Darrell Elijah (Cy) Blanton (July 6, 1908 – September 13, 1945) was a starting pitcher in Major League Baseball who played for the Pittsburgh Pirates and Philadelphia Phillies. Blanton batted left-handed and threw right-handed. Blanton was a screwball pitcher.

Pitching career
Blanton grew up in Trousdale, Oklahoma, and was living in Shawnee, Oklahoma, playing on sandlot teams. In 1929 he joined the Shawnee Robins, a C Class team in the Western Association. Blanton was a pitcher for the Independence Producers in 1931.  The Independence Producers were a Class C minor league team located in Independence, Kansas.  Blanton had twelve wins and eight losses for the season.

Blanton was one of the mainstays of the Pittsburgh Pirates rotation in the mid-1930s. He pitched for the Albany Senators in 1934, being promoted to Pittsburgh to pitch one game. Earlier he pitched in the Piedmont League and the Western Association.

In his 1935 rookie season he recorded 18 wins with 142 strikeouts and led the National League in earned run average (2.58) and shutouts (4). He averaged 12.67 wins for the next three years, leading again the league in shutouts in 1936 (4) and starts in 1937 (34). A free agent before the 1940 season, he signed with the Philadelphia Phillies. Although he made the National League All-Star team in 1937 and 1941, he never showed again the brilliance of his first season. He last pitched for the Phillies in 1942, being released after a month long stay in hospital due to kidney problems.
 
In a nine-season career, Blanton posted a 68–71 record with a 3.55 ERA and 611 strikeouts.

Death
He was suspended by the Hollywood Stars for failure to get in shape in March 1945. He returned to Oklahoma from California where he had been living just before he died. Blanton died in Norman, Oklahoma, at the age of 37, from internal hemorrhaging as a result of cirrhosis. His body was taken to Shawnee, Oklahoma, for burial in the nearby Tecumseh Cemetery. He left a wife, Marie, and four children including a son, Zane, who briefly played in the minor leagues with the Chicago Cubs and Philadelphia Phillies.

See also
 List of Major League Baseball annual ERA leaders

References

External links

The Deadball Era

1908 births
1945 deaths
People from Waurika, Oklahoma
National League All-Stars
National League ERA champions
Philadelphia Phillies players
Pittsburgh Pirates players
Major League Baseball pitchers
Baseball players from Oklahoma
Screwball pitchers
Deaths from cirrhosis
Alcohol-related deaths in Oklahoma